Surface magnon-polaritons (SMPs) are a type of quasiparticle  in condensed matter physics. They arise from the coupling of incident electromagnetic (EM) radiations to the magnetic dipole polarization in the surface layers of a solid . Magnons are analogous to other forms of polaritons such as, plasmons  and  phonons but represent an oscillation of the magnetic component of the solid's EM field rather than its electric component or a mechanical oscillation in the solid's atomic structure. 

They are sometimes referred to as magnetic surface polaritons (MSPs).

By employing, artificially constructed metamaterials , whose properties mainly stem from their  engineered  internal  fine  structures rather than their bulk physical make up, it is possible to more easily achieve useful SMPs.  However, they can be found in several natural magnetic materials, including at THz frequencies in antiferromagnetic crystals.

Magnons offer a way to  control light-matter interactions at Terahertz frequencies.

References 

Quasiparticles
Plasmonics